Prosthechea is a genus of flowering plants in the orchid family (Orchidaceae). The name is derived from the Greek word prostheke (appendix), referring to the appendage on the back of the column. Appendage orchid is a common name for this genus. Prosthechea is abbreviated Psh. in the horticultural trade.

Morphology
The roots of all Prosthechea species possess a velamen (a thick sponge-like covering) differentiated into epivelamen and endovelamen. Flavonoid crystals were observed in both the roots and leaves. The erect stems form flattened or thickened pseudobulbs. There are 1 to 3 terminal, sessile leaves. The leathery blade is ovate to lanceolate.  (Euchile leaves are softer and thinner than other Prosthechea leaves.)

The flowers form an apical, paniculate raceme with a spathe at the base of the inflorescence. There is a great variety in the flowers of this genus. They may be attached to the stem by a peduncle or they may be sessile. They can flower on the raceme at the same time or successively. They can be resupinate or non-resupinate (as in Prosthechea cochleata).  Prosthechea flowers are unique among the Laeliinae in producing fluorescent flavenoid crystals when preserved in ethanol with 5% sodium hydroxide.

The sepals are almost equal in length, while the petals can be much slender. The lip is pressed closely (adnate to proximal) to half of the column and shows a callus (a stiff protuberance). The column is 3- to 5-toothed at its top.

There are four, almost equal pollinia with an inverted egg shape. There are four stalks (or caudicles) in two pairs. The beak is entire, curved into a half circle and covered with viscous glycoside crystals.

The fruits consist of ellipse-shaped to egg-shaped, 1-locular, 3-winged capsules.

Taxonomy
The genus Prosthechea has only recently (1997; published in 1998) been reestablished by W. E. Higgins as a distinct genus (see references).  Two species were later transferred to Euchile (E. citrina and E. mariae) by Withner in 1998.  The status of Euchile species as sister to Prosthechea excluding Euchile was confirmed by Higgins in his doctoral dissertation in 2000.  Previously, the species had been included in different genera : Anacheilium, Encyclia, Epidendrum, Euchile, Hormidium and Pollardia. The status as genus was confirmed by recent data, based on molecular evidence (nuclear (nrITS) and plastid (matK and trnL-F) DNA sequence data) (W. E. Higgins et al. 2003).

Distribution
This is a neotropical epiphytic genus, widespread across much of Latin America from Mexico to Paraguay, as well as in Florida and the West Indies.

Species

 Prosthechea abbreviata (Schltr.) W.E.Higgins (1997 publ. 1998).
 Prosthechea aemula (Lindl.) W.E.Higgins (1997 publ. 1998).
 Prosthechea alagoensis (Pabst) W.E.Higgins (1997 publ. 1998).
 Prosthechea allemanii (Barb.Rodr.) W.E.Higgins (1997 publ. 1998).
 Prosthechea allemanoides (Hoehne) W.E.Higgins (1997 publ. 1998).
 Prosthechea aloisii (Schltr.) Dodson & Hágsater (1999).
 Prosthechea apuahuensis (Mansf.) Van den Berg (2001).
 Prosthechea arminii (Rchb.f.) Withner & P.A.Harding (2004).
 Prosthechea baculus (Rchb.f.) W.E.Higgins (1997 publ. 1998).
 Prosthechea barbozae Pupulin (2004).
 Prosthechea bennettii (Christenson) W.E.Higgins (1997 publ. 1998).
 Prosthechea bicamerata (Rchb.f.) W.E.Higgins (1997 publ. 1998).
 Prosthechea boothiana (Lindl.) W.E.Higgins (1997 publ. 1998).
 Prosthechea brachiata (A.Rich. & Galeotti) W.E.Higgins (1997 publ. 1998).
 Prosthechea brachychila (Lindl.) W.E.Higgins (1997 publ. 1998).
 Prosthechea brassavolae (Rchb.f.) W.E.Higgins (1997 publ. 1998).
 Prosthechea bulbosa (Vell.) W.E.Higgins (1997 publ. 1998).
 Prosthechea caetensis (Bicalho) W.E.Higgins (1997 publ. 1998).
 Prosthechea calamaria (Lindl.) W.E.Higgins (1997 publ. 1998).
 Prosthechea campos-portoi (Pabst) W.E.Higgins (1997 publ. 1998).
 Prosthechea campylostalix (Rchb.f.) W.E.Higgins (1997 publ. 1998).
 Prosthechea carrii V.P.Castro & Campacci (2001).
 Prosthechea chacaoensis (Rchb.f.) W.E.Higgins (1997 publ. 1998).
 Prosthechea chondylobulbon (A.Rich. & Galeotti) W.E.Higgins (1997 publ. 1998).
 Prosthechea christyana (Rchb.f.) Garay & Withner (2001).
 Prosthechea cochleata (L.) W.E.Higgins (1997 publ. 1998).
 Prosthechea cochleata var. cochleata.
 Prosthechea cochleata var. triandra (Ames) Hágsater (2002).
 Prosthechea concolor (Lex.) W.E.Higgins (1997 publ. 1998).
 Prosthechea cretacea (Dressler & G.E.Pollard) W.E.Higgins (1997 publ. 1998).
 Prosthechea elisae Chiron & V.P.Castro (2003).
 Prosthechea faresiana (Bicalho) W.E.Higgins (1997 publ. 1998).
 Prosthechea farfanii Christenson (2002).
 Prosthechea fausta (Rchb.f. ex Cogn.) W.E.Higgins (1997 publ. 1998).
 Prosthechea favoris (Rchb.f.) Salazar & Soto Arenas (2001).
 Prosthechea fortunae (Dressler) W.E.Higgins (1997 publ. 1998).
 Prosthechea fragrans (Sw.) W.E.Higgins (1997 publ. 1998).
 Prosthechea garciana (Garay & Dunst.) W.E.Higgins (1997 publ. 1998).
 Prosthechea ghiesbreghtiana (A.Rich. & Galeotti) W.E.Higgins (1997 publ. 1998).
 Prosthechea gilbertoi (Garay) W.E.Higgins (1997 publ. 1998).
 Prosthechea glauca Knowles & Westc. (1838).
 Prosthechea glumacea (Lindl.) W.E.Higgins (1997 publ. 1998).
 Prosthechea grammatoglossa (Rchb.f.) W.E.Higgins (1997 publ. 1998).
 Prosthechea greenwoodiana (Aguirre-Olav.) W.E.Higgins (1997 publ. 1998).
 Prosthechea guttata (Schltr.) Christenson (2003).
 Prosthechea hajekii D.E.Benn. & Christenson (2001).
 Prosthechea hartwegii (Lindl.) W.E.Higgins (1997 publ. 1998).
 Prosthechea hastata (Lindl.) W.E.Higgins (1997 publ. 1998).
 Prosthechea ionocentra (Rchb.f.) W.E.Higgins (1997 publ. 1998).
 Prosthechea ionophlebia (Rchb.f.) W.E.Higgins (1997 publ. 1998).
 Prosthechea jauana (Carnevali & I.Ramírez) W.E.Higgins (1997 publ. 1998).
 Prosthechea joaquingarciana Pupulin (2001).
 Prosthechea kautzkii (Pabst) W.E.Higgins (1997 publ. 1998).
 Prosthechea lambda (Linden ex Rchb.f.) W.E.Higgins (1997 publ. 1998).
 Prosthechea latro (Rchb.f. ex Cogn.) V.P.Castro & Chiron (2003).
 Prosthechea leopardina (Rchb.f.) Dodson & Hágsater (1999).
 Prosthechea lindenii (Lindl.) W.E.Higgins (1997 publ. 1998).
 Prosthechea linkiana (Klotzsch) W.E.Higgins (1997 publ. 1998).
 Prosthechea livida (Lindl.) W.E.Higgins (1997 publ. 1998)
 Prosthechea longipes (Rchb.f.) Chiron (2005)
 Prosthechea maculosa (Ames, F.T.Hubb. & C.Schweinf.) W.E.Higgins (1997 publ. 1998).
 Prosthechea magnispatha (Ames, F.T.Hubb. & C.Schweinf.) W.E.Higgins (1997 publ. 1998).
 Prosthechea megahybos (Schltr.) Dodson & Hágsater (1999).
 Prosthechea michuacana (Lex.) W.E.Higgins (1997 publ. 1998)
 Prosthechea micropus (Rchb.f.) W.E.Higgins (2005)
 Prosthechea moojenii (Pabst) W.E.Higgins (1997 publ. 1998).
 Prosthechea mulasii Soto Arenas & L.Cerv. (2002 publ. 2003).
 Prosthechea neglecta Pupulin (2001).
 Prosthechea neurosa (Ames) W.E.Higgins (1997 publ. 1998).
 Prosthechea obpiribulbon (Hágsater) W.E.Higgins (1997 publ. 1998).
 Prosthechea ochracea (Lindl.) W.E.Higgins (1997 publ. 1998).
 Prosthechea ochrantha (A.Rich.) (ined.)
 Prosthechea ortizii (Dressler) W.E.Higgins (1997 publ. 1998).
 Prosthechea pamplonensis (Rchb.f.) W.E.Higgins (1997 publ. 1998).
 Prosthechea panthera (Rchb.f.) W.E.Higgins (1997 publ. 1998).
 Prosthechea papilio (Vell.) W.E.Higgins (1997 publ. 1998).
 Prosthechea pastoris (Lex.) Espejo & López-Ferr. (2000).
 Prosthechea pringlei (Rolfe) W.E.Higgins (1997 publ. 1998).
 Prosthechea prismatocarpa (Rchb.f.) W.E.Higgins (1997 publ. 1998).
 Prosthechea pterocarpa (Lindl.) W.E.Higgins (1997 publ. 1998).
 Prosthechea pulcherrima (Klotzsch) W.E.Higgins (1997 publ. 1998).
 Prosthechea pulchra Dodson & W.E.Higgins (2001).
 Prosthechea punctifera (Rchb.f.) W.E.Higgins (1997 publ. 1998).
 Prosthechea pygmaea (Hook.) W.E.Higgins (1997 publ. 1998).
 Prosthechea racemifera (Dressler) W.E.Higgins (1997 publ. 1998).
 Prosthechea radiata (Lindl.) W.E.Higgins (1997 publ. 1998).
 Prosthechea regnelliana (Hoehne & Schltr.) W.E.Higgins (1997 publ. 1998).
 Prosthechea rhombilabia (S.Rosillo) W.E.Higgins (1997 publ. 1998).
 Prosthechea rhynchophora (A.Rich. & Galeotti) W.E.Higgins (1997 publ. 1998).
 Prosthechea sceptra (Lindl.) W.E.Higgins (1997 publ. 1998).
 Prosthechea semiaptera (Hágsater) W.E.Higgins (1997 publ. 1998).
 Prosthechea serrulata (Sw.) W.E.Higgins (1997 publ. 1998).
 Prosthechea sessiliflora (Edwall) W.E.Higgins (1997 publ. 1998).
 Prosthechea silvana Cath. & V.P.Castro (2003).
 Prosthechea sima (Dressler) W.E.Higgins (1997 publ. 1998).
 Prosthechea spondiada (Rchb.f.) W.E.Higgins (1997 publ. 1998).
 Prosthechea suzanensis (Hoehne) W.E.Higgins (1997 publ. 1998).
 Prosthechea tardiflora Mora-Ret. ex Pupulin (2001).
 Prosthechea tigrina (Linden ex Lindl.) W.E.Higgins (1997 publ. 1998).
 Prosthechea tripunctata (Lindl.) W.E.Higgins (1997 publ. 1998).
 Prosthechea trulla (Rchb.f.) W.E.Higgins (1997 publ. 1998).
 Prosthechea vagans (Ames) W.E.Higgins (1997 publ. 1998).
 Prosthechea varicosa (Bateman ex Lindl.) W.E.Higgins (1997 publ. 1998).
 Prosthechea vasquezii Christenson (2003).
 Prosthechea venezuelana (Schltr.) W.E.Higgins (1997 publ. 1998).
 Prosthechea vespa (Vell.) W.E.Higgins (1997 publ. 1998).
 Prosthechea vinacea Christenson (2003).
 Prosthechea vitellina (Lindl.) W.E.Higgins (1997 publ. 1998).
 Prosthechea widgrenii (Lindl.) W.E.Higgins (1997 publ. 1998).

Gallery

References 

 
 
 

   (in French)

Footnotes

External links 

 
Laeliinae genera
Epiphytic orchids